Tambov Donskoye Airport  is an airport serving city of Tambov, located in Donskoye,  northeast of Tambov, in the Tambov Oblast of Russia.

Airlines and destinations

References

External links

Tambov Airport official website 

Airports built in the Soviet Union
Airports in Tambov Oblast